St Peter's Catholic College is a coeducational secondary school located in South Bank, North Yorkshire, England. It is part of the Nicholas Postgate Catholic Academy Trust.

Founded in 1940, it has served the Diocese of Middlesbrough for over 75 years, achieving academy status in 2014, having previously been a specialist college in maths and technology.

The school has been a member of the Nicholas Postgate Catholic Academy Trust since 2018, a multi academy trust which sponsors 37 academies across the Diocese of Middlesbrough, including Trinity Catholic College in Middlesbrough, St Patrick’s Catholic College in Thornaby and Sacred Heart Catholic Secondary in Redcar.

The school offers sixth form provision through Trinity Catholic College Sixth Form in Middlesbrough. In 2020, the school announced an extensive multi-million pound redevelopment of its site, including the construction of a new digital learning wing and sports and recreational facilities.

The current executive headteacher is Michael Burns, and the head of school is Steph Garthwaite. The chair of governors is Nicky Jamalizadeh.

Ofsted judgements
The school was judged Inadequate by Ofsted in 2017. It was inspected again in 2019 and judged Requires Improvement.

Extra-curricular activities

Sport 
The sporting schedule is arranged by season and currently covers;
 Football
 Netball
 Rugby
 Athletics

Performing Arts 
Opportunities for students to engage in music and drama include;
 Music Club
 Drama Club

Subject Specific 
 Poetry Lectures
 Maths Lectures
 Science Club
 French Club

Other 
 Cooking Club
 Homework Club
 Chess Club
 Dungeons and Dragons Club

Notable former pupils 
 Vin Garbutt, folk singer
 Wilf Mannion, footballer
 Rob Smedley, F1 Engineer
 Greg Clark, Member of Parliament for Tunbridge Wells

References

Secondary schools in Redcar and Cleveland
Catholic secondary schools in the Diocese of Middlesbrough
Academies in Redcar and Cleveland